Towns County is a county located in the northeastern part of the U.S. state of Georgia. As of the 2020 census, the population was 12,493. Its county seat is Hiawassee. The county was created on March 6, 1856, and named for lawyer, legislator, and politician George W. Towns.

Geography
Towns is mostly in the Hiwassee River sub-basin of the Middle Tennessee-Hiwassee basin, with a part of the county in the Tugaloo River sub-basin in the larger Savannah River basin, as well as a small portion of the county's southwestern corner in the Chattahoochee River sub-basin of the ACF River Basin (Apalachicola-Chattahoochee-Flint River Basin), near the source of the Chattahoochee in neighboring Union County. Towns County is inside the Bible Belt.

Towns County is located amidst the Blue Ridge Mountains, (part of the Appalachian Mountains), some of which are protected by the Chattahoochee National Forest.  Brasstown Bald, the highest mountain in Georgia, rises in southwest Towns County, straddling the Union County line.  The source of the Hiwassee River is located in eastern Towns County, from which it flows northward into North Carolina.  Chatuge Lake, an artificial reservoir created by the completion of Chatuge Dam by the Tennessee Valley Authority in the 1940s, dominates the northeastern section of Towns County and extends into North Carolina. State Route 515 from north of Atlanta ends here at the North Carolina state line near Young Harris.

The county was traversed by a road built upon a traditional Cherokee trading path, which ran north to south through the county, passing through Unicoi Gap. It served as a line between European-American settlers and the Cherokee until after the Indian cessions and Indian Removal in the 1830s, when it fell solely into the hands of the whites. When the Cherokee were expelled by US forces from their villages, they were forced temporarily into "removal forts." One had been constructed in what is now Hiawassee, the county seat. They were forced to travel what is known as the Trail of Tears to Indian Territory west of the Mississippi River, a journey during which many Cherokee died.

Major highways

  U.S. Route 76
  State Route 2
  State Route 17
  State Route 66
  State Route 75
  State Route 180
  State Route 288
  State Route 339
  State Route 515

Adjacent counties
 Clay County, North Carolina (north)
 Rabun County (east)
 Habersham County (southeast)
 White County (south)
 Union County (west)

National protected area
 Appalachian Trail (part)
 Chattahoochee National Forest (part)

Demographics

2000 census
As of the census of 2000, there were 9,319 people, 3,998 households, and 2,826 families living in the county.  The population density was 56 people per square mile (22/km2).  There were 6,282 housing units at an average density of 38 per square mile (15/km2).  The racial makeup of the county was 98.80% White, 0.13% Black or African American, 0.17% Native American, 0.31% Asian, 0.18% from other races, and 0.41% from two or more races.  0.72% of the population were Hispanic or Latino of any race.

There were 3,998 households, out of which 20.80% had children under the age of 18 living with them, 61.90% were married couples living together, 6.30% had a female householder with no husband present, and 29.30% were non-families. 26.00% of all households were made up of individuals, and 13.10% had someone living alone who was 65 years of age or older.  The average household size was 2.20 and the average family size was 2.61.

In the county, the population was spread out, with 16.30% under the age of 18, 9.10% from 18 to 24, 20.50% from 25 to 44, 28.30% from 45 to 64, and 25.90% who were 65 years of age or older.  The median age was 49 years. For every 100 females there were 89.90 males.  For every 100 females age 18 and over, there were 87.80 males.

The median income for a household in the county was $31,950, and the median income for a family was $37,295. Males had a median income of $28,657 versus $21,813 for females. The per capita income for the county was $18,221.  About 8.80% of families and 11.80% of the population were below the poverty line, including 13.60% of those under age 18 and 10.40% of those age 65 or over.

2010 census
As of the 2010 United States Census, there were 10,471 people, 4,510 households, and 2,981 families living in the county. The racial makeup of the county was 97.7% white, 0.4% black or African American, 0.4% Asian, 0.3% American Indian, 0.6% from other races, and 0.6% from two or more races. Those of Hispanic or Latino origin made up 2.0% of the population. In terms of ancestry, 16.3% were Irish, 15.4% were German, 13.8% were English, 11.7% were American, and 8.3% were Scotch-Irish.

Of the 4,510 households, 20.2% had children under the age of 18 living with them, 56.0% were married couples living together, 7.6% had a female householder with no husband present, 33.9% were non-families, and 30.1% of all households were made up of individuals. The average household size was 2.17 and the average family size was 2.65. The median age was 51.1 years.

The median income for a household in the county was $39,540 and the median income for a family was $48,020. Males had a median income of $31,668 versus $27,127 for females. The per capita income for the county was $21,527. About 5.6% of families and 9.3% of the population were below the poverty line, including 13.2% of those under age 18 and 7.7% of those age 65 or over.

2016
As of 2016 the largest self-reported ancestry groups in Towns County were:
 English - 15.2%
 German - 15.1%
 American - 14.7%
 Irish - 13.3%
 Scottish - 5.2%
 Scots-Irish - 3.6%
 Italian - 3.4%
 French - 3.4%
 Swedish - 1.8%
 Polish - 1.7%
 Welsh - 1.6%
 Dutch - 1.6%

2020 census

As of the 2020 United States census, there were 12,493 people, 4,898 households, and 3,240 families residing in the county.

Government
Towns County's Sole Commissioner is Cliff Bradshaw, who has served since 2017.

Towns County's Sheriff, Chris Clinton, was elected in a special election in 2007. Clinton was re-elected in the general election in 2008, where he ran unopposed after serving only four months in office.

Towns County's Judge of Magistrate and Probate Court is D. David Rogers, who was elected in 2008, beating 30-year Democratic incumbent Wayne Garrett. Rogers and his wife, Alicia, live in Young Harris, GA. He is the son of well-known minister, Rev. James "Jimmy" Rogers of Hayesville, NC and Helen Adams Rogers of Andrews, NC. The Towns County Probate and Magistrate Courts are combined with a single judge presiding over both Courts. This combination court is one of very few in the State of Georgia (Long County is another example).

Politics

Communities

Cities
 Hiawassee
 Young Harris

Census-designated place
 Tate City

Notable natives
 Zell Miller – former Georgia governor and U.S. senator.

See also

 National Register of Historic Places listings in Towns County, Georgia
List of counties in Georgia

References

External links

 Georgia Mountain Beacon (online news) Website
 Towns County Herald (local newspaper) Website

 
Georgia (U.S. state) counties
1856 establishments in Georgia (U.S. state)
Northeast Georgia
Counties of Appalachia
Populated places established in 1856